Craig Robert Kusick Jr. (born June 28, 1973, in Apple Valley, Minnesota) is a former American football quarterback in the Arena Football League.  He played four seasons, two for the Milwaukee Mustangs (1997, 2001) and two for the Grand Rapids Rampage (1999–2000). He was named Second Team All-Arena in 1999.  He attended the University of Wisconsin–La Crosse, where in 1995 he led his team to the Division III championship and won the Melberger Award as the top player in Division III.

Kusick is the son of former Major League Baseball player Craig Kusick.

External links
AFL stats from arenafan.com

1973 births
Living people
American football quarterbacks
Grand Rapids Rampage players
Milwaukee Mustangs (1994–2001) players
Wisconsin–La Crosse Eagles football players
People from Apple Valley, Minnesota
Players of American football from Minnesota
Sportspeople from the Minneapolis–Saint Paul metropolitan area
Wisconsin–La Crosse Eagles baseball players